Ficus blepharophylla is a species of fig tree in the family Moraceae.

The tree is endemic to Roraima state in northern Brazil.

It is an IUCN Red List Endangered species.

References

blepharophylla
Endemic flora of Brazil
Flora of Roraima
Plants described in 1984
Endangered flora of South America
Taxonomy articles created by Polbot